The Blackspring Ridge Wind Project is a wind farm located in Vulcan County, Alberta. The wind farms generates 300 MW of electricity and was the largest wind farm in Western Canada by installed capacity, until the completion of the Whitla, Alberta wind farm was expanded to 353MW in December 2021. It is co-owned by EDF Renewables and Enbridge.

See also
 List of wind farms in Canada
 List of largest power stations in Canada

References

Wind farms in Alberta